Ilir Hoti (10 May 1957 – 1 March 2016) was an Albanian economist and banker. Hoti was governor of the Bank of Albania from May 1992 until September 1993. From 2012 to January 2015 he was Dean of Faculty of Business at Aleksandër Moisiu University of Durrës.

A graduate of the Faculty of Economy and Agribusiness, Agricultural University of Tirana, he served as an associate professor. He was fluent in English and Italian.

Arsidi scandal
Hoti was arrested in 1993, along with former Prime Minister Vilson Ahmeti, for the "Arsidi" scandal, but he was subsequently released by the Court of Tirana. Hoti was acquitted.

Books
He is the author of several books, including Financial Management (2009), Financial Management (2011), and Risk Management And Insurance Industry (2011). He is the author of the trilingual dictionary on Economy (Albanian, Italian and English).

Honours and awards
 Honorary Citizen of Durrës (post mortum)

References

1957 births
2016 deaths
Albanian economists
Albanian non-fiction writers
Agricultural University of Tirana alumni
People from Durrës
Academic staff of Aleksandër Moisiu University
Governors of the Bank of Albania
Financial writers
Deaths from cancer in Albania
Deaths from melanoma